Double Exposure is a 2014 Chinese horror thriller film directed by Li Jinhang. It was released on October 17.

Cast
Qin Wenjing
Ma Wenlong
Sabrina Qiu
Wang Wei
Wang Ziqiang
Zhou Xiang
Muhua Changlong
Yu Haorui
Li Chengfeng
Wang Ting
Bao Xianjun
Li Yuan

Reception
By October 20, the film had earned ¥3.88 million at the Chinese box office.

References

2014 horror films
2014 horror thriller films
Chinese horror thriller films
2014 films